The 1916–17 season  was Madrid Football Club's 15th season in existence. The club played some friendly matches. They also played in the Campeonato Regional Centro (Central Regional Championship) and the Copa del Rey, winning both competitions.

Friendlies

Copa Foronda

Copa Espuñes / Copa Maura

Competitions

Overview

Campeonato Regional Centro

League table

Matches

Copa del Rey

Quarterfinals

Semifinals

Final

Notes

References

External links
Realmadrid.com Official Site
1916–17 Squad
1916–17 matches
1916–17 (Campeonato de Madrid)
International Friendlies of Real Madrid CF – Overview

Real Madrid CF
Real Madrid CF seasons